"Hot! Wild! Unrestricted! Crazy Love" is a 1986 song by Millie Jackson. It was one of three tracks to have appeared on her 1986 album An Imitation of Love and on her 1989 album Back to the Shit.

It made #99 on the UK Singles Chart and achieved a #9 peak on the US Hot Black Singles chart.

References

1986 singles
Millie Jackson songs
1985 songs
Jive Records singles